Parliamentary elections were held in Lithuania on 10 June 1936, after a new law on holding elections was issued by presidential decree.

Background 
Candidates had to be nominated by district or town councils. The number of candidates nominated was equal to the number of seats available, and the number of seats was reduced from 85 to 49. All political parties were banned except the Lithuanian Nationalist Union and its allies.

Results
The Nationalist Union won 42 seats, whilst the remaining seven were taken by Young Lithuania, a youth branch of the Nationalist Union. The fourth Seimas first met on 1 September 1936, and drew up a new constitution, which was promulgated on 11 February 1938.

References

Lithuania
Parliamentary
Lithuania
Parliamentary elections in Lithuania
Single-candidate elections